Anthinus henselii is a species of air-breathing land snail, a terrestrial gastropod mollusk in the family Strophocheilidae.

This species is also known as Drymaeus henselii and then it is placed in the subfamily Bulimulinae, family Orthalicidae.

This species was originally described by Eduard von Martens as Bulimulus henselii in 1868. The specific name is in honor of the German naturalist, paleontologist and zoologist Reinhold Friedrich Hensel (1826–1881), who collected the first two specimens from which the species was described.

The type locality is Costa da Serra in the state Rio Grande do Sul, which is the southernmost State of Brazil. This species is endemic to Brazil.

This species is accidentally listed twice in the Checklist of Rio Grande do Sul State (2009): as Drymaeus henselii (Martens, 1868) (subfamily Bulimulinae, family Orthalicidae) and as Gonyostomus henselii (Martens, 1868) in family Strophocheilidae. This species also inhabits Santa Catarina in Brazil (listed as Drymaeus henselii (Martens, 1868)).

Description 
The shell is perforate, ovate-turreted, irregularly striate and sculptured with very delicate, very close spiral lines. The color of the shell is whitish, painted with brown streaks, which are confluent in the middle of each whorl. The apex is obtuse, brownish. The shell has 6 whorls, that are rather flattened. The suture is irregularly undulating. The last whorl is little convex below.

The aperture is subvertical, ovate-oblong, nearly half the length of the shell. The peristome is a little thickened, lightly spreading and white. The columellar margin is dilated, not closing the perforation, expanded above in a parietal lamina. Columella itself is twisted.

The length of the shell is 40 mm. The width of the shell is 28 mm. The height of the aperture is 20 mm. The width of the aperture is 11 mm.

References
This article incorporates public domain text from the reference.  

Strophocheilidae
Endemic fauna of Brazil
Molluscs of Brazil
Taxa named by Eduard von Martens
Gastropods described in 1868
Taxonomy articles created by Polbot
Taxobox binomials not recognized by IUCN